Rotelle is a type of pasta resembling wheels with spokes. They are similar to fiori.

The name derives from the Italian word for a small wheel. In Italy they are also called "ruote", and in the US they are usually called "wagon wheels".

References

Types of pasta